Albert Ramos-Viñolas was the defending champion, but he did not participate this year.
Federico Delbonis won the title, defeating Rogério Dutra Silva, 6–1, 7–6(8–6) in the final.

Seeds

Draw

Finals

Top half

Bottom half

References
 Main Draw
 Qualifying Draw

Aspria Tennis Cup - Trofeo CDI - Singles
2015 - Singles